Osvald may refer to:
 Osvald (given name)
 Surname:
 Hugo Osvald (1892–1970), Swedish botanist and plant ecologist specializing on mire ecology, Sphagnum and peat formation
 Osvald Group, Norwegian sabotage organisation during World War II led by Asbjørn Sunde, who used Osvald as one of his cover names

See also 
 Oswald (disambiguation)